Carlos Alonso (born 4 February 1929) is an Argentine contemporary painter, draftsman and printmaker. Though he was a Social realist in his early career, he is best known as a New realist. Beef is a common element in his work.

Early years
Born in Tunuyán, where he lived until age seven, he later moved with his family to Mendoza.  At the age of fourteen, he entered the Academia Nacional de Bellas Artes where he studied under [ergio Sergi in drawing and engraving, Lorenzo Dominguez in sculpture, and Bernareggi Francisco and Ramón Gomez Cornet in painting. At the National University of Cuyo, he studied with Lino Enea Spilimbergo.

Career
Alonso received his first award in 1947. In 1951, he won first prize at the Salon of Painting in San Rafael, the North Hall in Santiago del Estero, and drawing at the Salon del Norte Tucumán. In 1953, Alonso exhibited at the Gallery Viau of Buenos Aires, then traveled to Europe where he exhibited in Paris and Madrid. In 1957, he won the competition held by Emecé Editores to illustrate the part 2 of the Miguel de Cervantes novel Don Quixote, and the José Hernández poem Martín Fierro in 1959.  In 1961, he won the Premio Chantal del Salón de Acuarelistas y Grabadores of Buenos Aires. In the same year, while visiting London, he discovered acrylic painting techniques. His Don Quixote pictures were published on postcards in the Soviet Union in 1963.

His work, characterized by expressive power and social commitment, has been exhibited in numerous exhibitions, including at the Art Gallery International (Buenos Aires), where, in 1967, some 250 of his works relating to Dante Alighieri's Divine Comedy were exhibited.  Other exhibitions included the Palacio de Bellas Artes in Mexico City, as well as tapestries and collages at the Museo Nacional de Bellas Artes de La Habana in Cuba. In 1971, his works were exhibited in European galleries such as Villa Giulia in Rome, the Eidos of Milan, and the Bedford in London. In 2005, to mark the 400th anniversary of Don Quixote part 1 being published, the Museum of Design and Illustration held a tribute exhibition at Buenos Aires' Museo de Artes Plásticas Eduardo Sívori where Alonso's prints and original drawings were displayed. His illustrations have been included in the novel Mad Toy by Roberto Arlt.

He was granted the Platinum Konex Award in 1982 and 1992 for his work in the decade, and the Konex Special Mention for his whole trajectory in 2012.

Personal life
Alonso married the artist Ivonne Fauvety.  Following the coup of 1976, and the disappearance of his daughter Paloma (born 25 July 1956) the following year, Alonso went into exile in Italy, and in 1979, he moved to Madrid. He returned to Argentina two years later.  The Bienal de Pintura Paloma Alonso. named in her honor, is a 1990 joint initiative of Alonso and Teresa Nachman.

Alonso is the uncle of the chess grandmaster Salvador Alonso.

Partial works
 Alonso, C. (2007). Carlos Alonso, ilustrador. Buenos Aires: Fundación Alon.

References

1929 births
Living people
Argentine painters
Argentine male painters
People from Mendoza Province
Social realist artists
Nouveau réalisme artists